Off Parole is the third studio album by American rapper Rappin' 4-Tay, released March 19, 1996 on Chrysalis Records. The album features production by The Enhancer, G-Man Stan, Lil' Fly, Mike Dean, Rappin' 4-Tay and Too Short. It peaked at number 10 on the Billboard Top R&B/Hip-Hop Albums and at number 38 on the Billboard 200. The album features guest performances by Too Short, MC Breed, Lil' Fly, Get Low Playaz (JT The Bigga Figga, San Quinn & Seff The Gaffla) and Jasmyne Forté (4-Tay's Seven Year Old Daughter).

Four music videos were produced to promote the album, including: "Never Talk Down" featuring Too Short & MC Breed, "A Lil' Some'em Some'em", "Ain't No Playa (Playaz Sh*t)" and "Off Parole".

The song, "Never Talk Down", is a slightly different version than the one presented on Too Short's album, Gettin' It.

Track listing
 "I Paid My Dues" - 4:25
 "New Trump" (featuring Lil' Fly) - 4:14
 "A Lil' Some'em Some'em" - 5:37
 "Check Ya Self!" - 3:27
 "Ain't No Playa (Playaz Shit)" (featuring Passion) - 5:02
 "Never Talk Down" (featuring Too Short & MC Breed) - 5:37
 "25-2-Life" - 5:04
 "Boogie Bang Bang" (featuring Franky J.) - 4:29
 "Comin' Back" - 4:04
 "Hala at a Playa!" - 4:11
 "Game on the Shelf" (featuring Get Low Playaz) - 3:43
 "Off Parole" - 4:14
 "Where's the Party" - 4:55
 "Phat Like That" (featuring Jasmyne Forté) - 3:42
 "Still Ph#@*in' wit My Folk$" (featuring Primo, T-Lowe, D-Moe, Nate The Banksta & Hugh E. MC) - 4:47
 "Ain't No Playa" (radio mix) - 4:14

Chart history

References

External links 
 Off Parole at Discogs
 Off Parole at Tower Records

Rappin' 4-Tay albums
1996 albums
Albums produced by Mike Dean (record producer)